Suzhuang is a town in Kaihua County, Quzhou City, Zhejiang Province, China. , it administers the following 11 villages:
Suzhuang Village
Tangtou Village
Gaokeng Village
Xixi Village
Yu Village
Hengzhong Village
Fangpo Village
Gutian Village
Maotan Village
Fuhu Village
Mingfu Village

References 

Township-level divisions of Zhejiang
Kaihua County